Sufetula nitidalis is a moth of the family Crambidae. It was described by George Hampson in 1908 and is found in Sri Lanka.

This species has a wingspan of 20 mm.

References

Moths described in 1908
Spilomelinae